Stanley Gilbert Hawes MBE, (19 January 1905 – 19 April 1991) was a British-born documentary film producer and director who spent most of his career in Australia, though he commenced his career in England and Canada. He was born in London, England and died in Sydney, Australia. He is best known as the Producer-in-Chief (1946–1969) of the Australian Government's filmmaking body, which was named, in 1945, the Australian National Film Board, and then, in 1956, the Commonwealth Film Unit. In 1973, after he retired, it became Film Australia.

Career

He started work in 1922 as a committee clerk with the City of Birmingham Corporation, but started his film career in 1931, when he co-founded the Birmingham Film Society. He arrived in Australia in 1946, from the National Film Board of Canada, to take up a position as Producer-in-Chief with the Australian National Film Board, initially as a temporary assignment but made permanent within a couple of years of his arrival. Hawes is regarded as working primarily in the classical style of documentary he learnt with John Grierson in the 1930s.  As Moran writes, 'Films such as School in the Mailbox, Flight Plan and The Queen in Australia make clear his aesthetic preference for the classic documentary rather than for drama or the more evocative, poetic forms of documentary'.

He was elected a member of the board in 1952 and became a member of the British Film Academy the following year. He joined UNESCO in 1958 and chaired the National Film Theatre of Australia between 1970 and 1974. In 1971 he was appointed to chair the Film Board of Review.

Awards

In 1970 he was awarded an MBE and the Raymond Longford Award from the Australian Film Institute

The Stanley Hawes Award

The $5,000 Film Australia Stanley Hawes Award was established in 1997 to honour Stanley Hawes as first Producer-in-Chief of the Australian National Film Board and Commonwealth Film Unit. The award recognises the significant support he gave independent filmmakers in the documentary sector and is thus awarded to a person or organisation that makes an outstanding contribution to the documentary sector in Australia. The award is announced annually at the Australian International Documentary Conference.

Awardees:

1997 Graham Chase
1999 John Heyer
2001 Pat Fiske
2003 Stewart Young
2004 Robin Hughes
2005 CAAMA (Central Australian Aboriginal Media Association) Productions
2006 John Hughes
2007 Michael Gissing
2008 David Bradbury
2009 Bob Connolly
2010 Tom Zubrycki
2011 Rachel Perkins
2012 Julia Overton
2013 Documentary Australia Foundation
2014 Chris Hilton
2015 Pauline Clague
2016 Sonya Pemberton
2017 Brian Beaton
2018 Curtis Levy
2019 James Bradley
2020 Janine Hosking
2021 Michaela Perske
2022 David Tiley

Selected filmography

Producer

Today We Live: A Film of Life in Britain (1937, Associate producer)
Here is the Land (1937)
Timber Front (1940) 
Heroes of the Atlantic (1941) 
Women are Warriors (1942) 
Crocodile Hunters (1949)
Darwin-Doorway to Australia (1949)
Australia's Greatest River (1950)
Know Your Children (1950)
The Shearers (1950)
Bush Policemen (1952)
Snowy Waters (1952)
Mike and Stefani (1952)
Outback Patrol (1952)
Across the Frontiers (1953)
Bush Policeman (1953)
The Queen in Australia (1954)
Melbourne Olympic City (1956)
Bring out a Briton (1958)
Welcome Your Majesty (1958)
The Queen Returns (1963)
The Presidential Tour (1966)
Expo 70 series (1970)

Director

The G.B.I. Geography of Scotland: Water Power (1937)
Here is the Land (1937)
Man into Monkey (1938)
Speed the Plough (1939)
The Home Front (1940) 
Maple Sugar Time (1941)
The World in Action: The Invasion of North Africa (1942)
School in the Mailbox (1946)
Building for Tomorrow (1947)
Flight Plan (1950)
The Queen in Australia (1954)
Children's Theatre (1961)

Editor

Dry Dock (1936)

Notes

References
Moran, Albert (1987) 'Documentary Consensus: The Commonwealth Film Unit: 1954–1964' in O'Regan, T and Shoesmith, B (eds) History on/and/in Film, Perth, History & Film Association of Australia
Moran, Albert (1991) Projecting Australia: government film since 1945 Sydney, Currency Press

External links
Stanley Hawes at the National Film and Sound Archive
Stanley Hawes at the National Film Board of Canada

1905 births
1991 deaths
Australian documentary film producers
British emigrants to Australia
British documentary film producers
British expatriates in Canada